Les Berges du Lac (Arabic: ضفاف البحيرة) is an affluent neighborhood in Tunis, Tunisia. It has developed since the 1980s after building polders in Tunis Lake. It harbors many embassies, companies, and institutions, including:
 EU Embassy
 Indonesia Embassy
 Iraq Embassy
 Lebanon Embassy
 Malaysia Embassy
 Norway Embassy
 Palestine Embassy 
 Sweden Embassy
 UK Embassy
 US Embassy
 Citroën Tunisia
 Dahdah Park
 Fiat Tunisia
 Groupe Tunisie Télécom
 GTZ Tunisia
 HP Tunisia
 Mediterranean School of Business
 Microsoft Tunisia
 Orange Tunisia
 Siemens Tunisia
 Total Tunisia
 Ooredoo
 LG Electronics Tunisia
 SAMSUNG Tunisia
 Tunis Sports City
 Vermeg
 Embassy of Germany
 Embassy of Canada
 ICMPD
 Union Internationale de Banques (General Directorate)

The Berges du Lac development does not currently serve alcohol.  This was a condition imposed by investors from Saudi Arabia.

References 

Tunis